The 2020 Western Kentucky Hilltoppers football team (WKU) represented Western Kentucky University in the 2020 NCAA Division I FBS football season. The Hilltoppers played their home games at the Houchens Industries–L. T. Smith Stadium in Bowling Green, Kentucky, as members of the East Division of Conference USA (C–USA). They were led by second-year head coach Tyson Helton.

Previous season
The Hilltoppers finished the 2019 regular season 9–4, 6–2 in CUSA which they tied for second in the East Division with Marshall. The team was invited to play in the First Responder Bowl against Western Michigan, where the Hilltoppers took their ninth win of the season.

Preseason

Award watch lists 
Listed in the order that they were released

CUSA media days
The CUSA Media Days will be held virtually for the first time in conference history.

Preseason All-CUSA teams
To be released

Schedule
Western Kentucky announced its 2020 football schedule on January 8, 2020. The 2020 schedule consists of 6 home and 5 away games in the regular season.

The Hilltoppers had games scheduled against Indiana and Old Dominion, which were canceled due to the COVID-19 pandemic.

Schedule Source:

Game summaries

at Louisville

Liberty

at Middle Tennessee

Marshall

at UAB

Chattanooga

at BYU

at Florida Atlantic

Southern Miss

FIU

at Charlotte

vs. Georgia State (LendingTree Bowl)

References

Western Kentucky
Western Kentucky Hilltoppers football seasons
Western Kentucky Hilltoppers football